The Underground Man is a 1981 Argentine drama film directed by Nicolás Sarquís. The film was selected as the Argentine entry for the Best Foreign Language Film at the 54th Academy Awards, but was not accepted as a nominee.

Cast
 Antonio Ber Ciani
 Jesús Berenguer
 Héctor Bidonde as Jalil
 Aldo Braga as Casanegra
 Lucrecia Capello
 Alberto de Mendoza as Diego Carmona
 Regina Duarte as Luisa Dos Santos
 Ulises Dumont as Baibiene
 Adela Gleijer
 Miguel Ligero as Severo

See also
 List of submissions to the 54th Academy Awards for Best Foreign Language Film
 List of Argentine submissions for the Academy Award for Best Foreign Language Film

References

External links
 

1981 films
1981 drama films
Argentine drama films
Films based on works by Fyodor Dostoyevsky
1980s Spanish-language films
1980s Argentine films